Apni Khushian Apne Gham is an Indian television series that aired on SAB TV, based on the story of four friends from different 'Caste group': a Hindu, Muslim, Sikh, and Marathi.

Plot
The series depicts the lives of four friends who share all their joys and sorrows among each other on their daily morning walk.

Cast 
 Natasha Sinha
 Paintal
 Ravi Kishan
 Shalini Kapoor Sagar
 Dimple Inamdar
 Rammohan Sharma

References

Sony SAB original programming
Indian television soap operas
2001 Indian television series debuts
Sikhism in fiction